Hanif Sanket (born 23 October 1958) born as A.K.M. Hanif is a Bangladeshi television host, writer, producer, comedian, voice actor and singer. He is best known as the creator and host of the television show Ityadi. He is regarded as the most popular media personality in Bangladesh.

Career
Sanket first appeared in television on a show Jodi Kichhu Mone Na Koren in the 1980s. Later, he moved on to create his own TV show Ityadi, which successfully pioneered televised comedy program in Bangladesh and went on to become the most popular TV show in the country. He also produces drama during Eid seasons.

Sanket also produced other shows - Jhalak, Kothar Kotha, Eid Annondo Mela, Prothom Alo Awards Program, Bangla Vision 6th Anniversary Programs.

Awards
 Ekushey Padak for social activities (2010)
 National Poribesh Padak for environmental awareness activities (2014)
Meril Prothom Alo Awards best television magazine.

References

Living people
1958 births
Bangladeshi television personalities
Recipients of the Ekushey Padak
Bangladeshi comedians
Comilla Victoria Government College alumni
People from Barisal District